Blood and Thunder may be:

 Blood and Thunder (book) by Hampton Sides
 "Blood and Thunder" (song) by Mastodon
 Blood and Thunder (comics), comic book series 
 Blood and Thunder (album) by Mortiis
 Blood and thunder, American dime novel genre
 Blood & Thunder: The Life & Art of Robert E. Howard, a biography of Robert E. Howard